Sir Donald Conroy McIntyre  (born 22 October 1934 in Auckland) is an operatic bass-baritone from New Zealand.

Operatic career
McIntyre made his formal debut as Zaccaria in Nabucco, at the Welsh National Opera, in 1959. In 1964 he created the role of the Stranger in the world premiere of Gian Carlo Menotti's Martin's Lie at the Bath International Music Festival. He has appeared at Covent Garden (from 1967, debuting as Pizarro in Fidelio), the Bayreuth Festival (from 1967), the Teatro alla Scala (the Old Servant in Elektra, 2014), etc.  He first sang at the Metropolitan Opera in 1975, as Wotan in Das Rheingold, and was seen at that theatre until 1996.

His discography includes Pelléas et Mélisande (as Golaud, with George Shirley and Elisabeth Söderström, conducted by Pierre Boulez, 1969), Parsifal (as Klingsor, opposite Dame Gwyneth Jones, 1970), Lohengrin as Friedrich von Telramund (conducted by Rudolf Kempe), Œdipus Rex (conducted by Sir Georg Solti, with Sir Peter Pears, 1976), Parsifal (as Gurnemanz, led by Sir Reginald Goodall, 1984), as well as Handel's oratorios, Messiah and Israel in Egypt.

A major accomplishment was his Wotan/Wanderer at Bayreuth in the Jahrhundertring (Centenary Ring) in 1976, celebrating the centenary of both the festival and the first performance of the complete cycle, conducted by Pierre Boulez and staged by Patrice Chéreau, recorded and filmed in 1979 and 1980.  Also on DVD are Sir Donald's performances of Der fliegende Holländer (conducted by Wolfgang Sawallisch, 1974), Elektra (as Orest, with Birgit Nilsson conducted by James Levine, in Herbert Graf's production, 1980), Die Meistersinger von Nürnberg (conducted by Sir Charles Mackerras, 1988), Arabella (with Dame Kiri Te Kanawa, 1994), as well as another Elektra (conducted by Levine, 1994).

Honours
McIntyre was appointed an Officer of the Order of the British Empire in the 1977 New Year Honours, for services to opera. In the 1985 Queen's Birthday Honours, he was promoted to Commander of the Order of the British Empire. He was appointed a Knight Bachelor, for services to opera, in the 1992 Queen's Birthday Honours.  He won a Grammy Award in 1982 for recording the role of Wotan/Wanderer.

References

 The Concise Oxford Dictionary of Opera, by John Warrack & Ewan West, Oxford University Press, 1996.

External links 
 Wotan.

1934 births
Living people
New Zealand expatriates in the United Kingdom
20th-century New Zealand male opera singers
Operatic bass-baritones
New Zealand bass-baritones
New Zealand Knights Bachelor
Singers awarded knighthoods
New Zealand Commanders of the Order of the British Empire